The Cal Poly Pomona Broncos women's basketball team is the women's basketball team that represents California State Polytechnic University, Pomona, in Pomona, California. The school's team currently competes in the California Collegiate Athletic Association.

History
Cal Poly began play in 1974. They have appeared in the NCAA Division II women's basketball tournament 25 times, with a record of 56-20. They have won the Tournament five times while also finishing as runner up three times. They are tied with North Dakota State for the most Division II titles (5) and most title game appearances (8). They appeared in the first Division II title game in 1982, winning 93–74 over Tuskegee. From 1982 to 1989, they appeared in the Championship six times, each winning and losing thrice.

Season-by-season record
As of the end of the 2016-17 season, the Broncos have an all-time record of 927-345.

Postseason

AIAW College Division/Division II
The Broncos made four appearances in the AIAW National Division II basketball tournament, with a combined record of 6–4.

NCAA Division II Championships

NCAA Division II runner-up teams:
1983
1987
1989

References